Gordon Judges (born July 30, 1947) is a former professional Canadian football defensive lineman for the Montreal Alouettes in the Canadian Football League.

Judges played his amateur football with the Scarborough Rams. He had a 14-year career with Montreal and the Toronto Argonauts from 1968 to 1982. He played in 6 Grey Cup games, winning 3, in 1970, 1974 and 1977.  In 1978 Gordon was chosen the Alouettes Most Valuable Player.

He won the 2002 NFL/CFL High School Coach of the Year award for his work with St. Mary Catholic Secondary School in Pickering, Ontario. His son, James Judges, was selected by the Alouettes in the fourth round (31st overall) in the 2007 CFL Draft and signed in March, 2008.

References 

1947 births
Living people
Canadian football defensive linemen
Montreal Alouettes players
Montreal Concordes players
Canadian football people from Toronto
Players of Canadian football from Ontario
Toronto Argonauts players